The Abede is a river of southern central Papua New Guinea. It flows into Deception Bay on the Gulf of Papua. The Abede River is a noted landmark on several tours around southern central Papua New Guinea.

References

Rivers of Papua New Guinea
Gulf Province